Hantu is a genus of  cellar spiders first described by B. A. Huber in 2016.  it contains only two species.

References

External links

Araneomorphae genera
Pholcidae